William Creek, Australia is located halfway on the Oodnadatta Track,  north west of Marree and  east of Coober Pedy in South Australia. The town has a permanent population of 10. William Creek is in the federal Division of Grey and the state electorate of Stuart. It is outside of council areas, and administered by the Outback Communities Authority.

Location
William Creek is the entry point from Coober Pedy to Lake Eyre in the Tirari Desert. William Creek offers the only petrol station between Marree, Coober Pedy and Oodnadatta on the Oodnadatta Track and has a campground, two motels and one of the world's most remote pubs. The world's largest cattle station is located in nearby Anna Creek Station and the Woomera Prohibited Area, is also nearby.

William Creek is a good halfway stop along the track, with accommodation and meals at the hotel as well as a well-maintained, if somewhat dusty campground. In the Memorial Park it is possible to see many diverse items although more sobering is the commemorative inscription to a young Austrian woman, who died in 1998 trying to walk back to William Creek from a 4WD vehicle bogged in the sand beside Lake Eyre. The first stage of the Black Arrow Rocket, Britain's only successful independent space launch was recovered from the surrounding Anna Creek Station and located in the memorial park for nearly 50 years but has been recently brought back to the UK by technology firm Skyrora.

William Creek is serviced twice weekly by the Coober Pedy Oodnadatta One Day Mail Run. The 4WD mail truck also carries some general freight and passengers.

History
William Creek is on the traditional lands of the Arabana people. In May 2012, the Federal Court granted the Arabana people native title to more than 68,000 square kilometres in the region.

The name William Creek was given to the area in November 1859 by explorer John McDouall Stuart during his expeditions in the area. William was the second son of John Chambers, a pioneer pastoralist of South Australia and a strong ally of Stuart.

A small settlement arose in the late 1880s as a result of the railway. Although, work on the Great Northern railway (which we now know as The Ghan) commenced in the 1878 near Port Augusta, it took a decade for the line to reach William Creek, in June 1889. Work on the line continued, ultimately linking Port Augusta to Oodnadatta which became the northern railhead until the late 1920s. As large work parties flowed into the area, a boarding house was established there in 1886 and James Jagoe's Eating house is recorded to be there in October 1886. In 1890, Henry Lane received a 'wine license' for the site and assume Jagoe's business and facilities. In 1911, Gilbert Reed describes a whistle-stop on a train journey to Oodnadatta; he eats at Paige's boarding house—the meal is goat, dressed up as mutton.

In 1896, William Creek became a repeater station on the Australian Overland Telegraph Line with William Charles Brennan (b. 1861–1918) as the first Station Master. It replaced nearby Strangways Springs which was decommissioned and reverted to pastoral lands.

Early tourists to the area were mesmerized by the vast expanses, the heat, the mound springs and the distances.

The town has always been small: never larger than a few cottages, a small school and a Hotel-store. The historic William Creek Hotel is listed on the South Australian Heritage Register.

Near William Creek
Lake Eyre can be seen from several vantage points along the Oodnadatta Track and appears as a large, rather featureless, white saltpan. It is only from the air that its immensity can be appreciated. The curvature of the Earth can be seen on the horizon and beneath it is possible to identify the courses of the ancient rivers that still occasionally flow into the lake. Trevor Wright and the pilots from Wrightsair take up to five passengers for a 60-minute flight out of William Creek, passing over the spectacular Painted Hills to the west, then along the southern edge of the lake, pointing out the features beneath and explaining the topography. The Painted Hills are brilliantly coloured eroded sandstone ridges. These, and all of the country traversed in the one-hour flight, are part of Anna Creek Station. From the air the Track can be seen, stretching to the horizon in two directions.

References

External links 

Memorial Park at William Creek
A model of the William Creek Hotel in Google 3D Warehouse

Far North (South Australia)
Places in the unincorporated areas of South Australia